Barrel Fever and Other Stories is a 1994 collection of short stories and essays by David Sedaris. The book is divided into two sections. The first section consists of short fiction and the second half contains autobiographical essays. The most famous of the essays is "SantaLand Diaries", the essay that made Sedaris famous when he read it on National Public Radio in 1992. The essay tells of his experiences working as an elf at Macy's.

Contents

Stories
 Parade
 Music for Lovers
 The Last You'll Hear from Me
 My Manuscript
 Firestone
 We Get Along
 Glen's Homophobia Newsletter Vol. 3, No. 2
 Don's Story
 Season's Greetings to Our Friends and Family!!!
 Jamboree
 After Malison
 Barrel Fever

Essays
 Diary of a Smoker
 Giantess
 The Curly Kind
 SantaLand Diaries

1994 short story collections
1994 non-fiction books
Works by David Sedaris
American short story collections
American essay collections
Little, Brown and Company books